My Friend Barbara is a 1937 German comedy film directed by Fritz Kirchhoff and starring Grethe Weiser, Paul Hoffmann and Ingeborg von Kusserow.

The film's sets were designed by Gustav A. Knauer. Some location filming took place around Lake Constance.

Cast 
 Grethe Weiser as Barbara
 Paul Hoffmann as Dr. Reinerz
 Elisabeth Ried as Stefanie
 Frank Zimmermann as Frank
 Ingeborg von Kusserow as Lucie
 Ellen Bang as Ursula
 Manny Ziener as Frau Werner
 Luise Morland as Emelie
 Gudrun Ady as Klara
 Hans Leibelt as Andermann sen.
 Jakob Tiedtke as Stockinger
 Wilhelm P. Krüger as Lohmeyer
 Angelo Ferrari as Geschäftsführer
 Arthur Schröder as Hotelchef
 Günther Ballier as Oberkellner

References

Bibliography

External links 
 

1937 films
Films of Nazi Germany
German comedy films
1937 comedy films
1930s German-language films
Films directed by Fritz Kirchhoff
UFA GmbH films
German black-and-white films
1930s German films